Mainiyari  is a village development committee in Parsa District in the Narayani Zone of southern Nepal. At the time of the 2011 Nepal census it had a population of 6,627 people living in 934 individual households. There were 3,405 males and 3,222 females at the time of census.

References

Populated places in Parsa District